Tarlton International Raceway is a drag racing strip just outside Krugersdorp in South Africa on the R24 Route.

See also
Drag racing

References

External links

 Tarlton, Official homepage
 Motorsport South Africa, the South African Motorsport governing body.

Drag racing venues
Motorsport venues in South Africa